The Embudo Creek also known as Rio Embudo is a river formed by the confluence of the Rio Pueblo and Santa Barbara Creek near Peñasco in Rio Arriba County, New Mexico.  The Embudo (named after the Spanish word meaning  “funnel”) empties into the Rio Grande in the community of Embudo between two distinctively shaped buttes, thus creating a funnel effect after which it is named.  Before emptying into the Rio Grande the river flows through Dixon.

Gallery

See also

 List of rivers of New Mexico

References

Rivers of New Mexico
Rivers of Rio Arriba County, New Mexico
Tributaries of the Rio Grande